The 73rd parallel south is a circle of latitude that is 73 degrees south of the Earth's equatorial plane in the Antarctic. The parallel passes through the Southern Ocean and Antarctica.

Around the world
Starting at the Prime Meridian and heading eastwards, the parallel 73° south passes through:

{| class="wikitable plainrowheaders"
! scope="col" width="125" | Co-ordinates
! scope="col" | Continent or ocean
! scope="col" | Notes
|-
| 
! scope="row" rowspan="5" | Antarctica
| Queen Maud Land, claimed by 
|-
| 
| Western Australian Antarctic Territory, claimed by 
|-
| 
| Adélie Land, claimed by 
|-
| 
| Eastern Australian Antarctic Territory, claimed by 
|-
| 
| Ross Dependency, claimed by 
|-
| style="background:#b0e0e6;" | 
! scope="row" style="background:#b0e0e6;" | Southern Ocean
| style="background:#b0e0e6;" | Ross Sea, south of the Pacific Ocean
|-
| 
! scope="row" rowspan="2" | Antarctica
| Marie Byrd Land, Unclaimed territory
|-
| 
| Antártica Chilena, claimed by 
|-
| style="background:#b0e0e6;" | 
! scope="row" style="background:#b0e0e6;" | Southern Ocean
| style="background:#b0e0e6;" | Bellingshausen Sea, south of the Pacific Ocean
|-
| 
! scope="row" | Antarctica
|-
| style="background:#b0e0e6;" | 
! scope="row" style="background:#b0e0e6;" | Southern Ocean
| style="background:#b0e0e6;" | Bellingshausen Sea, south of the Pacific Ocean
|-
| 
! scope="row" | Antarctica
|-
| style="background:#b0e0e6;" | 
! scope="row" style="background:#b0e0e6;" | Southern Ocean
| style="background:#b0e0e6;" | Weddell Sea, south of the Atlantic Ocean
|-
| 
! scope="row" | Antarctica
| Queen Maud Land, claimed by 
|}

See also
72nd parallel south
74th parallel south

s73